A by-election was held for the Australian House of Representatives seat of Wakefield on 10 December 1938. This was triggered by the death of United Australia MP Charles Hawker.

The election was won by Labor candidate Sydney McHugh from a massive 20 percent two-party swing.

Results

See also
 List of Australian federal by-elections

References

1938 elections in Australia
South Australian federal by-elections